Port Stanton/Sparrow Lake Water Aerodrome  is located adjacent to Port Stanton, Ontario, Canada.

References

Registered aerodromes in Ontario
Seaplane bases in Ontario